The #SchoolsNotPrisons Tour is a free music and art tour that is partnering with California communities that have been impacted by the overuse of punishment and incarceration.
'#SchoolsNotPrisons Tour' promotes non-violence and activism by young people, it also encourages voting as a key way for communities committed to safety, justice, and peace to join in solidarity to make change. #SchoolsNotPrisons Tour focuses on the mass incarceration problem that is occurring in California, the state has been overspending on prisons under the mistaken idea that punishing and incarcerating people is what keeps communities safe which It doesn’t, it has only broken families and communities apart – especially communities of color, and it is taking opportunity away from our young people. Since 1980, California has built 22 prisons but just one UC campus, and in 2014, youth arrests outnumbered youth votes.
Tour partners and artists are standing up for a new vision of school and community safety centered on health, education, and investing in youth.

The 2016 #SchoolsNotPrisons Tour was produced by Revolve Impact, and supported by The California Endowment and The California Wellness Foundation.

Partners 

 The California Endowment
 Revolve Impact
 The California Wellness Foundation
 Asian American Advancing Justice
 All of Us or None
 ACCE Action
 Anti-Recidivism Coalition
 Alliance for Boys and Men of Color
 California Calls
 Californians for Safety and Justice
 Children's Defense Fund
 CHIRLA
 Ella Baker Center for Human Rights
 Immigrant Legal Resource Center
 Mobilize the Immigrant Vote
 PICO California
 Presente.org
 Youth Law Center
 Always Knocking Inc.
 East Bay Asian Youth Center
 Sacramento Area Congregations Together
 Sol Collective
 Youth Development Support Services
 Faith in Fresno
 Fresno Barrios Unidos
 The Know Youth Media
 New America Media
 American Civil Liberties Union
 California Partnership
 Coachella UnIncorporated
 Raices Cultura
 TODEC Legal Center]]
 Social Immigration Project
 San Diego State University
 Fathers and Families of San Joaquin
 Little Manilla
 San Joaquin Pride Center
 Sons and Brothers
 Reinvent South Stockton Coalition
 Blu Educational Foundation
 Congregations Organized for Prophetic Engagement
 ICUC
 Life Center Church
 Youth Action Project
 Youth Law Center
 Culture Strike
 California Immigrant Policy Center
 National Council of La Raza
 RYSE Center
 Operation Street Kidz Philanthropy Kidz Club 
 African Coalition Workforce 
 Advancement Project 
 Mother of Many
 California School-Based Health Alliance 
 FuseBox Radio
 First Place For Youth 
 Southeast Asian Resource Action Center 
 Coleman Advocates
 Acta Non Verba Youth Urban Farm Project
 Centro Legal De La Raza
 Movement Strategy Center
 The Unity Council
 The Gathering For Justice
 World Trust Educational Services

2016 in California
August 2016 events in the United States